The 1998 Virginia Tech Hokies football team represented the Virginia Polytechnic Institute and State University during the 1998 NCAA Division I-A football season. The team's head coach was Frank Beamer.

Schedule

Rankings

Roster

References

Virginia Tech
Virginia Tech Hokies football seasons
Virginia Tech Hokies football